Ernest Harry Gill (24 August 1877 – 1 June 1950) was an English amateur footballer who made single appearances at right-back for Southampton in 1900 and for Leicester Fosse in 1901. He also made five appearances for Leicestershire County Cricket Club in 1901.

Football career
Gill was born in Mountsorrel, Leicestershire before moving to South West England where he played as an amateur for White Star (Poole), Bridgwater Town and Bristol City (without making any first-team appearances). His performances earned him a call-up to represent the Somerset County Football Association.

After playing for Grimsby Town reserves, he was offered a trial by Southern League champions, Southampton. He made his solitary appearance for the "Saints" on 17 March 1900, when he took the place of Peter Meechan at right-back against Sheppey United. Although the match was won 5–0 (with two goals each from former England internationals Alf Milward and Harry Wood), Gill had a poor game. Nonetheless, the Southampton board offered him a position with the club, which Gill decided to decline.

He subsequently turned out for local rivals, Freemantle, before moving back to his home county in 1901. He then signed for Leicester Fosse of the Football League Second Division, making one appearance at left-back, replacing George Swift.

Cricket career

During the summer of 1901, Gill made five appearances for Leicestershire, in which he scored a total of 23 runs and took 12 wickets, at averages of 11.50 and 34.41 respectively.

Family
His brother, George Gill also played cricket for Leicestershire, as well as for London County and Somerset.

References

1877 births
1950 deaths
Sportspeople from Loughborough
Footballers from Leicestershire
English footballers
Association football defenders
Bridgwater Town F.C. players
Bristol City F.C. players
Grimsby Town F.C. players
Southampton F.C. players
Freemantle F.C. players
Leicester City F.C. players
English Football League players
Southern Football League players
English cricketers
Leicestershire cricketers